John Knight  (c.1686–1733) of Gosfield Hall, Essex was a British landowner and Whig politician who sat in the House of Commons from 1710 to 1733.

Early life
Knight was the only son of John Knight and his wife Elizabeth. He was admitted at Middle Temple in 1702 and matriculated at  Wadham College, Oxford on 26 March 1703, aged 16. His first wife was Elizabeth Slaughter of Cheyne Court, Herefordshire. He succeeded his father in 1708,  and came into a significant inheritance. In about 1710 he acquired many Cornish estates from John Tredenham, and was listed as owning over £500 of Bank of England stock.

Career
The Tredenham property carried an interest for one seat at St Mawes, but at the  1710 British general election Knight was returned unopposed as Member of Parliament for St Germans. In 1711 he was included upon the list of ‘worthy patriots’ who had helped detect the mismanagements of the previous ministry, which implies Tory loyalties but his vote of in favour of the ‘No Peace without Spain’ motion on 7 December 1711 counters this.  His only other significant action in this Parliament was his vote on 18 June against the French commerce bill  He was returned unopposed again at the  1713 British general election. On 18 March 1714, he voted against the expulsion of Richard Steele, and was classed  as a Whig.

Knight bought Gosfield Hall in 1715 and at the 1715 British general election he was returned unopposed as an Administration candidate for St. Germans and continued voting with the Government. He was an Assistant of the Royal African Company from 1716 to 1722 and was secretary for the. Leeward Islands from 1718 to 1722. At the  1722 British general election he was returned unopposed as MP for Sudbury . At the 1727 British general election he  was returned for Sudbury and was also returned St. Mawes, choosing to represent Sudbury. He then voted against the Government on the civil list arrears in 1729, for them on the Hessians in 1730, against them on the army in 1732, but for them on the Excise Bill in 1733. He also seconded the Address on 16 January1733.

Later life and legacy
Knight married, Anne Newsham,  widow of John Newsham, MP, and daughter of James Craggs, as his second wife  on 13 March 1724. She was a friend of Alexander Pope with whom she and her husband maintained a correspondence.

Knight died on 2 October1733 leaving one surviving daughter by his second wife. His estates were inherited by his  widow, who erected a  monument by John Michael Rysbrack with an inscription by Pope to his memory in Gosfield church. After she remarried to  Robert Nugent, she ‘ordered it to be enclosed ... with a wainscot screen to shut it off from her sight when she went to church, which, however, she seldom did’.

References

1680s births
1733 deaths
Members of the Parliament of Great Britain for English constituencies
British MPs 1710–1713
British MPs 1713–1715
British MPs 1715–1722
British MPs 1722–1727
British MPs 1727–1734

Year of birth uncertain